Oksana Komissarova (born 15 November 1964) is a Russian swimmer. She took part in the 1980 Summer Olympics and finished fifth in the 800 m freestyle event.

Between 1995 and 1999 she competed in the masters category. She won a bronze medal at the world championships in 1996; she also won three national titles and set four national records.

She was born in Volzhsky, near Volgograd and in 1982 moved to Kishinev, but then returned to Volzhsky. She has five children, born between 1987 and 2007, and works as a sports instructor for children.

References

1964 births
Living people
Russian female swimmers
Russian female freestyle swimmers
Olympic swimmers of the Soviet Union
Soviet female swimmers
Swimmers at the 1980 Summer Olympics
People from Volzhsky, Volgograd Oblast
Sportspeople from Volgograd Oblast